Hadrotes is a genus of large rove beetles in the family Staphylinidae. There are at least three described species in Hadrotes.

Species
These three species belong to the genus Hadrotes:
 Hadrotes crassus Mannerheim
 Hadrotes extensus LeConte, 1861
 Hadrotes wakefieldi Cameron, 1945

References

Further reading

 
 

Staphylininae
Articles created by Qbugbot